Rhombodera rollei is a species of praying mantises in the family Mantidae, found in the Maluku Islands of Indonesia.

See also
List of mantis genera and species

References

Rhombodera
Mantodea of Asia
Insects described in 1935